Team Lufthansa was an alliance of regional airlines mainly in Germany, who flew niche routes on behalf of Lufthansa.

Overview
Team Lufthansa was founded in 1996 by Lufthansa in the wake of the deregulation of the airline market as new competitors like Deutsche BA challenged established airlines. Besides connecting point-to-point destinations, the alliance also provided Lufthansa flights on niche routes from Frankfurt and Munich. The founding members were later expanded by the accession of Rheintalflug, Air Littoral and Cirrus Airlines.

The alliance ceased to exist in 2004, when Lufthansa reorganized its regional network as Lufthansa Regional.

Members

The member airlines of Team Lufthansa were:

References

See also 

Lufthansa
Airline alliances
German companies disestablished in 2004
German companies established in 1996
Airlines disestablished in 2004
Airlines established in 1996